Derek John Seth-Smith (11 August 1920 – 24 June 1964) was an English first-class cricketer.

Born at Church Crookham, Seth-Smith was the son of the Berkshire minor counties cricketer Keith Seth-Smith. He served during World War II in the Royal Hampshire Regiment as a second lieutenant. He married Jean Halcro Erskine-Hill, the daughter of Alexander Erskine-Hill, on 16 September 1950. In that same year he appeared in a first-class cricket match for the Free Foresters against Oxford University at Oxford. He bowled six wicketless overs with his right-arm fast-medium bowling in Oxford's first-innings, while with the bat he was dismissed without scoring by Anthony Jessup in the Free Foresters first-innings, while in their second-innings he was dismissed by the same bowler for 3 runs. He died at Chelsea in June 1964.

References

External links

1920 births
1964 deaths
People from Hart District
British Army personnel of World War II
Royal Hampshire Regiment officers
English cricketers
Free Foresters cricketers